Ledra is the type genus of leafhoppers in the subfamily Ledrinae and the tribe Ledrini.  Ledra aurita can be found in Europe but most species occur in Asia.

Species 
The Catalogue of Life lists:
 Ledra arcuatifrons Walker 1857 - Borneo, Peninsular Malaysia
 Ledra auditura Walker 1858 - Taiwan, Japan, China, Korea, Russia, Hong-Kong
 Ledra aurita (Linnaeus, 1758) - Europe
 Ledra bilobata Schumacher 1915 - Taiwan, Japan
 Ledra buschi Schmidt 1926 – western Indonesia
 Ledra cingalensis Distant - Sri Lanka
 Ledra concolor Walker, 1851 - Australia
 Ledra conicifrons Walker 1857 - Borneo, Singapore
 Ledra conifera Walker 1857 - Borneo, Singapore
 Ledra depravata Jacobi 1944 - China
 Ledra dilatata Walker 1851 - Indian subcontinent, Sri Lanka, Myanmar 
 Ledra dilatifrons Walker 1857 - Borneo, Peninsular Malaysia
 Ledra dorsalis Walker 1851 - Indian subcontinent
 Ledra episcopalis Walker 1855
 Ledra fumata - China
 Ledra gibba Walker 1851 - Philippines
 Ledra gigantea Distant 1909 - Borneo
 Ledra hyalina Kuoh & Cai 1994 - China
 Ledra imitatrix Jacobi 1944
 Ledra intermedia Distant 1908
 Ledra kosempoensis Schumacher 1915
 Ledra laevis Walker 1851
 Ledra lineata Walker 1851
 Ledra longifrons Walker 1857
 Ledra muda Distant 1909
 Ledra mutica Fabricius 1803
 Ledra obtusifrons Walker 1857
 Ledra orientalis Ouchi 1938
 Ledra planifrons Walker 1857
 Ledra punctata Walker 1851
 Ledra quadricarina Walker 1858
 Ledra ranifrons Walker 1857
 Ledra reclinata Distant 1907
 Ledra rugosa Walker 1851
 Ledra serrulata Fabricius 1803
 Ledra solita (Walker)
 Ledra sternalis Jacobi 1944
 Ledra sublata Distant 1908
 Ledra truncatifrons Walker 1857
 Ledra tuberculifrons Walker 1857

Note: L. viridipennis Latreille 1811 is now placed as Zyzzogeton viridipennis (Latreille, 1811)

Gallery

References

External links
 
 

Auchenorrhyncha genera
Ledrinae